Božidar Leković (born 4 January 1991) is a Montenegrin handball player who plays for Serbian team RK Metalac and the Montenegrin national team.

References

1991 births
Living people
Montenegrin male handball players
People from Bar, Montenegro
Expatriate handball players
Montenegrin expatriate sportspeople in Romania
Mediterranean Games competitors for Montenegro
Competitors at the 2018 Mediterranean Games